Richard Edson (born January 1, 1954) is an American actor and musician.

Personal life
Edson was born in New Rochelle, New York to a Jewish family. He has one brother, Steven, who resides in the Boston area, and two sisters, Andrea, who resides in Newton, Massachusetts and Jennifer, who resides in New York City. His father, Arnold (1917–2012), was one of the first Marine officers to land at Guadalcanal in August 1942. After the war, his father became a toy manufacturer. His mother, Marian, a retired school teacher, resides in New Rochelle.

Music career
In 1979, Richard was a founding member of the San Francisco art rock band The Alterboys with Snuky Tate, Tono Rondone, Richard Kelly and JC Garrett, playing both drums and trumpet.  From 1981 to 1982, he was Sonic Youth's original drummer and played drums for Konk at the same time. After the release of Sonic Youth's self-titled debut EP, Edson left the band to play with Konk full-time. Edson also played trumpet with San Francisco band The Offs on the group's eponymous 1984 album.

Acting career
Following his music career, Edson has worked as an actor, appearing in over 35 movies.  His more notable roles include a disreputable parking garage attendant in Ferris Bueller's Day Off (1986), man at newspaper stand in Desperately Seeking Susan (1985), Richie in Howard the Duck (1986), Eddie in Jim Jarmusch's cult film Stranger Than Paradise (1984), real-life gambler Billy Maharg in Eight Men Out, and the title character in Joey Breaker (1993).  He also appeared in Platoon (1986), Good Morning, Vietnam (1987), Tougher Than Leather (1988), Let It Ride (1989), and Do the Right Thing (1989). He starred in the 1993 movie Super Mario Bros as Spike, King Koopa's cousin. In 1987, Edson performed live a main role in the Scott B and Joseph Nechvatal collaboration called Not a Door: A Spectacle at Hallwalls, based on the poetry of St. John of the Cross, Flaubert's Temptation of St. Anthony and works of Jean Genet and Georges Bataille.

Edson played the lead role in three films directed by Raphael Nadjari: The Shade (1999), I Am Josh Polonski's Brother (2001) and Apartment #5c (2002). In 2003, he appeared in the music video for Cave In's single, "Anchor". Edson played the central character of the video, a depressed man walking down the street with his feet encased in cement blocks.

His television appearances include The Adventures of Pete & Pete; the third-season finale of Homicide: Life on the Street; and the 1990–91 series Shannon's Deal, produced by John Sayles. Edson appeared in a 2007 TV commercial for The Travelers Companies Inc., in which he plays the human personification of risk.

Selected filmography

 1984 Stranger Than Paradise as Eddie
 1985 Desperately Seeking Susan as Man With Newspapers
 1986 Ferris Bueller's Day Off as Garage Attendant 
 1986 Howard the Duck as Ritchie 
 1986 Crime Story (TV Series) as Jake Rennick 
 1986 Platoon as Sal 
 1986 Walker as Turley 
 1987 Good Morning, Vietnam as Private Abersold 
 1988 Eight Men Out as Billy Maharg
 1988 Tougher Than Leather as Bernie Carteez 
 1988 The Chair as Riot Leader 
 1989 Bloodhounds of Broadway as Johnny Crackow 
 1989 Do the Right Thing as Vito 
 1989 Let It Ride as Johnny Casino
 1989 China Lake as Connie Veesk 
 1989 Monsters (TV Series) as Jack Bateman 
 1990-1991 Shannon's Deal (TV series)
 1991 Eyes of an Angel as Goon
 1992 Love Is Like That as Bubba-Lilly
 1992 Crossing the Bridge as Mitchell 
 1993 Split Ends (TV Series) as Eric 
 1993 Joey Breaker as Joey Breaker
 1993 Posse as Deputy Tom
 1993 Super Mario Bros. as Spike 
 1993 What About Me as Nick
 1993 Love, Cheat & Steal as Billy Quayle 
 1995 Jury Duty as Skeets
 1995 Destiny Turns on the Radio as Gage
 1995 Strange Days as 'Tick'
 1996 Scorpion Spring as Lem Wells 
 1996 Marco Polo The Missing Chapter as Bergman
 1996 Cosas que nunca te dije as Steve
 1996 The Winner as Frankie
 1996 Wedding Bell Blues as Tom 
 1996 An Occasional Hell as Rodney Gillen 
 1997 This World, Then the Fireworks as Joe
 1997 Snide and Prejudice as Rudolph Hess 
 1997 Double Tap as Fischer 
 1998 Lulu on the Bridge as Dave Reilly
 1998 Thick as Thieves as Danny
 1999 Purgatory (TV Movie) as Euripides
 1999 The Shade as Simon
 1999 Jack of Hearts as Henry
 2000 Cement as Robbo
 2000 The Million Dollar Hotel as Joe
 2000 Timecode as Lester Moore 
 2000 Picking Up the Pieces as Edsel Farkus 
 2000 A Man Is Mostly Water as Bud Guy 
 2000 Desperate But Not Serious as Screenwriter 
 2001 I Am Josh Polonski's Brother as Abe Polonski 
 2001 Southlander: Diary of a Desperate Musician as Thomas
 2001 P.O.V. - Point of View as Fool On Hill 
 2002  Sunshine State as Steve Tregaskis
 2002 Apartment #5C as Harold 
 2003 Highway to Oblivion (TV Movie) as Leslie
 2004 Starsky & Hutch as Monix
 2004 Land of Plenty as Jimmy 
 2004 Frankenfish (TV Movie) as Roland 
 2004 Goodnight, Joseph Parker as Frankie 
 2005 Welcome to California as Husband / Sylvio
 2005 The Kid & I as Guy Prince 
 2006 Hard Scrambled as Joe
 2006 The Astronaut Farmer as Chopper Miller 
 2006 Cut Off as Mikey 
 2007 Under There (Short) as Roman
 2008 Japan as Gus 
 2008 Momma's Man as Tom 
 2008 Columbus Day as Manny
 2008 Vicious Circle as John
 2009 Black Dynamite as Dino
 2009 The Smell of Success as Nelly 'The Nose '
 2009 The Greims (Short) as Larry
 2010 NUMB3RS (TV Series) as Nick Rowland
 2010 Happiness Runs as Pete 
 2010 Hands & Eyes (Short) as The Artist 
 2012 A Glimpse Inside the Mind of Charles Swan III as Sanchez 
 2012 Averageman
 2014 Dark Hearts as Ravetti
 2015 3 Holes and a Smoking Gun as Sam Dunkim
 2015 Dutch Book as Billy Santiago
 2018 Burning Shadow as Ronald
 2019 3 From Hell as Carlos Perro

References

External links

1954 births
Living people
American Jews
Jewish American male actors
American male film actors
American male actors
American rock drummers
American male television actors
Noise rock musicians
Musicians from New Rochelle, New York
Male actors from New Rochelle, New York
Sonic Youth members
No wave musicians
20th-century American drummers
American male drummers
Tito & Tarantula members